Acacia websteri is a shrub or tree belonging to the genus Acacia and the subgenus Juliflorae that is endemic to western Australia.

Description
The branchlets flattened near the  tips and are sparsely haired to glabrous and occasionally white-resinous. Like most species of Acacia it has phyllodes rather than true leaves. They taper to a point with a gently curved apex and have three nerves per face.

Distribution
It is native to an area in the Wheatbelt and Goldfields regions of Western Australia. It has a disjunct distribution from around Bencubbin and around the towns of Coolgardie and Kambalda where it is often situated in drainage depressions growing in red loam, sand and clay soils as a part of shrubland and scrub communities.

See also
List of Acacia species

References

websteri
Acacias of Western Australia
Plants described in 1927
Taxa named by Joseph Maiden
Taxa named by William Blakely